Jay Osborne is an American football coach. He is currently the offensive coordinator at  Independence Community College in Independence, Kansas. Osborne served as the head football coach at University of Saint Mary in Leavenworth, Kansas from 2014 to 2019.  Osborne also played college football for four years at Saint Mary. Osborne joined the program as the offensive coordinator in 2010.  He was named the "Interim" head coach, implying that the university will continue its search for a replacement.

Head coaching record

References

External links
 Saint Mary profile

Year of birth missing (living people)
Living people
American football return specialists
American football wide receivers
Independence Pirates football coaches
Saint Mary Spires football coaches
Saint Mary Spires football players